Antin Paplynsky ( (c. 1870-c.1919) was a Ukrainian musical instrument maker who crafted banduras from 1905-1918. He was rumoured to have been shot by the Bolsheviks in 1919 or 1920. Paplynsky's instruments had 32-34 strings and were diatonically tuned. He was a popular bandura maker because of the quality of his instruments. In 1909 he received a Grand Prix award at the World Trade Exhibition held in Paris. His instruments were sought after not only in Ukraine, but in Russia and Canada.

Instruments
Paplynsky's instruments were extremely lightweight and produced a rich and bright sound. Few instruments have survived. Those that have can fetch up to $5000 in private sales.

References

External reading
 Diakowsky, M. - A Note on the History of the Bandura. The Annals of the Ukrainian Academy of Arts and Sciences in the U.S. - 4, 3-4 №1419, N.Y. 1958 - С.21-22
 Diakowsky, M. J. - The Bandura. The Ukrainian Trend, 1958, №I,  - С.18-36
 Diakowsky, M. – Anyone can make a bandura – I did.  The Ukrainian Trend, Volume 6
 Haydamaka, L. – Kobza-bandura – National Ukrainian Musical Instrument. "Guitar Review" №33, Summer 1970 (С.13-18)
 Hornjatkevyč, A. – The book of Kodnia and the three Bandurists.  Bandura, #11-12, 1985
 Hornjatkevyč A. J., Nichols T. R. - The Bandura.  Canada crafts, April–May, 1979 p. 28-29
 Mishalow, V. - A Brief Description of the Zinkiv Method of Bandura Playing. Bandura, 1982, №2/6, - С.23-26
 Mishalow, V.  - The Kharkiv style #1. Bandura 1982, №6, - С.15-22 #2 – Bandura 1985, №13-14, - С.20-23 #3 – Bandura 1988, №23-24, - С.31-34 #4 – Bandura 1987, №19-20, - С.31-34 #5 – Bandura 1987, №21-22, - С.34-35
 Mishalow, V. - A Short History of the Bandura. East European Meetings in Ethnomusicology 1999, Romanian Society for Ethnomusicology, Volume 6, - С.69-86
 Mizynec, V. - Folk Instruments of Ukraine. Bayda Books, Melbourne, Australia, 1987 - 48с.
 Cherkaskyi, L. - Ukrainski narodni muzychni instrumenty. Tekhnika, Kyiv, Ukraine, 2003 - 262 pages. 

Bandura makers
Kobzarstvo
Bandurists
Businesspeople from Kyiv
Musicians from Kyiv
Year of death missing
Year of birth uncertain
20th-century Ukrainian musicians